The Atlantic Steam Navigation Company was founded in 1934 with the original object of providing a no-frills transatlantic passenger service.  A combination of difficult economic conditions and then World War II frustrated these early ambitions.

In 1946  the opportunity was taken to lease war-surplus LSTs from the Admiralty and start the world's first roll-on roll-off ferry service.  Starting with military charters returning materiel from Europe to England the company progressed to providing commercial services across the Irish Sea and then across the North Sea.  In 1971 the company was acquired by European Ferries.

History

Genesis of the company
The company was founded in 1934 by Frank Bustard, the Passenger Traffic Manager for the White Star Line when the latter was merged with the Cunard Line the same year.  The original idea was to set up a low cost line providing cheap passages between Europe and the United States.  He first attempted to purchase a number of surplus vessels from the Red Star Line but was unsuccessful.  He then approached Vickers Armstrong with designs for two new ships.  However the government of the day was not keen on a new company operating on the North Atlantic in competition with Cunard White Star and Bustard was not able to raise a loan from the Bank of England to finance construction.  The onset of World War II saw Bustard called up to the Army Reserve and his plans went into abeyance.  During the war he was present at trials of landing craft loading and unloading vehicles on the sands of New Brighton.

Post World War II
After demobilisation, Bustard tried again to implement his transatlantic plans but there were no suitable ships available and no chance of raising finance for a new build.  Instead he turned his thoughts to the use of surplus LSTs as vehicle ferries on the short sea routes across the North Sea.  After lengthy negotiations with the Admiralty he succeeded in chartering 3 LSTs, 3519, 3534 and 3512.  The ships needed modifications to engines, boilers and navigational aids as well as improved accommodation.  The maiden voyage of ASN took place on 11 September 1946 when LST3519, now renamed Empire Baltic, sailed from Tilbury with 64 new vehicles for the Dutch Army for delivery in Rotterdam.  The company continued to ferry thousands of military vehicles across the North Sea via Hamburg.  In 1955 the terminal was transferred from Hamburg to Antwerp.

In 1948 ASN acquired another LST which became the Empire Doric and was used to inaugurate a commercial service between Preston, Lancashire and Larne.  Early cargoes included a contract to carry 200 prefabricated houses, lorries loaded with glass from Pilkington's, and a circus.  This was the first commercial roll-on roll-off ferry service in the world.  It proved so successful that in 1950 the Empire Gaelic was acquired to operate a new service between Preston and Belfast.

In 1952, ASN were chosen to manage a fleet of 12 LSTs for the War Department, operating in the Middle & Far East. They were deployed to Japan during the Korean War.  This arrangement continued until 1961 when the operation transferred to the British-India Steam Navigation Company.

Nationalisation
In April 1954 ASN was nationalised and came under the auspices of the British Transport Commission.  With the dissolution of the BTC in 1962 the company was transferred to the Transport Holding Company.  In 1968 it became part of the National Freight Corporation, subsequently being sold to European Ferries in 1971.

Suez Crisis

In late 1956 the entire fleet was sent to Mediterranean during the Suez Crisis.  ASN had to charter in a number of ships to maintain the freight services from Preston. Initially three British coasters were acquired to be replaced by four German ships for the rest of the war.  Vehicle services were not resumed until January 1957.  At the same time ASN were responsible for the operation of 12 LSTS that had been recommissioned for the duration of the war.  These were known as the Seabird class.

Post Suez

In 1957 ASN ordered their first new ships, Bardic Ferry and Ionic Ferry  in a rolling programme to replace the original fleet of LSTs.  The ships were designed to carry both vehicles and container traffic, being equipped with their own electric cranes to handle the latter.  In addition the main car deck was strengthened to take tanks in the event of the vessels being required for military service.  The first of the LSTs to be withdrawn was the Empire Cedric in 1959.  The last was the Empire Nordic which survived until 1966.  The rest having gone by 1963.

In 1961 ASN started offering container services from Preston to various ports across the Irish Sea using a number of chartered vessels.  Starting with parallel services to Larne and Belfast they expanded to serve Drogheda, Dublin and, briefly, Waterford.

In 1965 ASN moved its North Sea base from Tilbury to the expanding port of Felixstowe which reduced the crossing time by half.

In 1969 the founder of the company, Lt-Colonel Frank Bustard was made a Freeman of Larne.

Routes
1946 - 1965 Tilbury - Rotterdam
1946 - 1955 Tilbury - Hamburg
1948 - 1971 Preston - Larne
1950 - 1971 Preston - Belfast
1955 - 1968 Tilbury - Antwerp
1961 - 1971 Preston - Drogheda
1963 - 1971 Preston - Dublin
1964 - 1966 Preston - Waterford
1965 - 1971 Felixstowe - Rotterdam
1968 - 1971 Felixstowe - Antwerp

Fleet

Chartered from Admiralty

The ships names commemorated White Star Liners.

Managed ships for RASC
1952-1961,  named after distinguished RASC officers.

Managed ships for the War Office

Mobilised for the Suez Crisis in late 1956.

New ships
The ships names again reflected ASN's White Star Line heritage.

Chartered ships

Suez Crisis

Preston container services

Maintenance cover
The following ships were chartered from Townsend Thoreson to cover the overhaul period of ASN's ships.

References

Notes

Bibliography

Transport operators of the United Kingdom
Ferry companies of England
Shipping companies of the United Kingdom